Avelino Cañizares Martínez (November 10, 1919 – December 13, 1993) was a former professional baseball shortstop. He played between 1944 and 1964.

References

External links
 and Seamheads

1919 births
1993 deaths
Águilas de Mexicali players
Cuban expatriate baseball players in Mexico
Algodoneros de Torreón players
Alijadores de Tampico players
Cleveland Buckeyes players
Diablos Rojos del México players
Industriales de Monterrey players
Keokuk Kernels players
Mexican League baseball players
México Azul players
Baseball players from Havana
Sultanes de Saltillo players
Sherbrooke Athletics players
Tuneros de San Luis Potosí players